SashaTanya is a Russian situation comedy television series, a spin-off of Univer. The first run started on June 3, 2013.

Plot
After graduation, Sasha and Tanya move into a two-room rented apartment on the outskirts of Moscow with their son. Sylvester A. Sergeyev cares about them. 
In a season 2 Sasha is doing well at work, and he is buying an apartment in a new residential complex. Sylvester A. Sergeyev is marrying Eva and becomes a father of a daughter.

Main сharacters

Sasha Sergeev 
Sasha Sergeev was a student of the Astronomical Faculty in the past, Insurance Manager at present. From the Season 2 he is a General Manager, Insurance. He is married to Tanya, with whom he lived in a dormitory. He has a son Alex. He loves fast food, because dissatisfied with Tatiana’s cooking. To the displeasure of his wife it is affecting his figure. He is struggling to be independent from his father, oligarch Sylvester A. Sergeyev.

Tanya Sergeeva 
Tanya Sergeeva is a posting-graduate student of Law Faculty in the past. She is a wife of Sasha Sergeev, with whom she lived in a dormitory. In the Season 1 she was a housewife. From the Season 2 she is an Administrator in a Beauty Salon.

Minor characters

Alex 
Alex is a son of Sasha and Tanya. He was born in that times when they were students.

Sylvester A. Sergeyev 
Sylvester A. Sergeyev is an oligarch, dollar billionaire (37th place in the Forbes), a father of Sasha. He lives on Rublyovka, and he has an expensive luxury car Rolls-Royce Phantom LONG. He is cynical, harsh, hot-tempered, but he has a very good sense of humor. Sylvester A. Sergeyev always tries to help to son and his family financially, though he understands that they don't like it. He often criticizes Gena using humorous epithets, but he considers Gena as a part of his family. In a Season 2 he married Eva, loved her very much and he cared about her and daughter.

Gena 
Head of Bodyguards of Sylvester A. Sergeyev. He was born in Zlatoust. He served in Russian Airborne Troops. He is silent, sullen and a bit stupid at first glance, but he is a good person, pretty clever, artistic and very competent in bodyguard profession. Gena is the object of jokes for Sylvester A. Sergeyev, but he betrayed to Sylvester with all his heart.

Gosha Rudkovsky 
A student of the Faculty of Journalism, he was in the army. Tricky and lazy. He loves beer and video games. He has a good sense of humor, but mostly makes jokes on his friends. He is a friend of Sasha and Tanya, and he dates Lily Volkova (they married in Episode 65).

Lily Volkova 
A student of Faculty of Biology. She was born in Ufa. She is fond of spiritualism and esoteric, very superstitious person. She always tells the truth (even insulting one) and she can’t keep people's secrets. She is vegetarian, extravagance in everything, but in the Season 2 she is more calm. A friend of Sasha and Tanya, she dates with Gosha Rudkovsky (they married in Episode 65).

Arthur "Michael" Mikaelyan 
Armenian from Adler. Womanizer. He graduated from the Faculty of History; he started to study in post-graduate course to avoid the conscription. He has a good sense of humor, a common sense, and he is very well in business, which helps him expertly extricate from a variety of unpleasant situations. A friend of Sasha and Tanya.

Vyacheslav Grigorievich 
Vyacheslav Grigorievich Komarov is Sasha's boss. He is democratic: he regularly catches employees for laziness, inactivity and mistakes at work, but he tells them about this with a bit of humor and irony.

Albert 
Neighbor of Sasha and Tanya. He prefers sporty style clothes and drinking alcohol. He is harmless, always ready (for a small fee) to help, but does not disdain small frauds (eg, in the Season 2 he takes the place of concierge in the building where Sergeyev lives).

Edward "Kuzya" Kuzmin 
Student of the Faculty of Philology, sportsman. He enjoys playing the guitar, he writes songs, which successfully performs, he was involved in karate before and got a black belt, but because of the head injury, he had to leave the sport. Very good in chess game. He was born in Agapovka, but a lot of time he spend in Kurgan. A friend of Sasha and Tanya.

Eva 
Eva Sergeeva is a former flight attendant from Krasnoyarsk, a wife Sylvester A. Sergeyev at present (Episode 56), mother of his daughter. She appears in Season 2. She is nice and friendly. She turns to Tanya for assistance in family life, considering her more experienced in it.

Cast

Cast 
 Andrey Gaidulyan as Sasha Sergeev
 Valentina Rubtsova as Tanya Sergeeva
 Артемий Широков, Yuriy Kepper as Alex
 Alexey Klimushkin as Sylvester A. Sergeyev
 Andrey Sviridov as Gena
 Larisa Baranova as Lily Volkova
 Alexey Gavrilov as Gosha Rudkovsky
 Ararat Keschyan as Arthur "Michael" Mikaelyan
 Sergey Rudzevich as Vyacheslav Grigorievich
 Pavel Kassniskiy as Albert
 Alina Lanina as  Eva

Episodes 
 Vitaliy Gogunskiy as Edward "Kuzya" Kuzmin (Episodes 1.1, 1.20)
 Stanislav Yarushin as Anton Martinov (Episodes 1.6, 1.8)
 Anna Kuzina as Yana Semakina (Episodes 1.6, 1.8)
 nastasya Samburskaya as Kristina Sokolovskaya (Episodes 1.6, 1.8)
 Anna Khilkevich as Maria Belova (Episodes 1.6, 1.8)
 Irina Rizhakova as Regina, owner of the apartment (Episode 1.9)
 Ashot Keschyan as Ashot Mikaelyan, brother of Arthur (Episode 1.9)
 Sergey Murzin as Neighbor (Episode 1.14)
 Elena Khlibko as Lingerie shop worker (Episode 1.18)
 Irina Bashkireva as Galina, Tanya's mother
 Dmirtiy Filimonov as Nikolay, Tanya's father

Invited celebrities 
 Elka — Episode 1.5
 Sergey Zverev — Episode 1.21
 Pavel Volya — New Year Episode
 Diskoteka Avariya — New Year Episode 
 Ekaterina Varnava — Episodes 2.2, 2.5
 Timur Batrutdinov — Episode 2.10
 Sergey Saphronov — Episode 2.18
 Gradusi — Episode 2.25
 Sergey Gorelikov — Episode 2.26

Film credits

Idea 
 Vyacheslav Dusmuchametov
 Semyon Slepakov

Directed by 
 Michael Starchak
 Sergey Kazachansky

Camera 
 Alexander Kuznetsov
 Yury Korobeinikov

Executive producer 
 Taymuraz Badziev

Creative producers 
 Maxim Shkalikov
 Alexey Ivanov
 Zaur Bolotaev

Producers 
 Artur Janibekyan
 Alexander Dulerayn
 Vyacheslav Dusmuchametov
 Semyon Slepakov

References

External links
Official website

TNT (Russian TV channel) original programming
Russian television sitcoms
2013 Russian television series debuts
2010s Russian television series
Television spin-offs